The Federal State of Austria (colloquially known as the "") was a continuation of the First Austrian Republic between 1934 and 1938 when it was a one-party state led by the conservative, nationalist and corporatist Fatherland Front. The result was an authoritarian government based on a mix of Italian Fascist and conservative Catholic influences.

It ended in March 1938 with the Anschluss (the German annexation of Austria). Austria would not become an independent country again until 1955, when the Austrian State Treaty ended the Allied occupation of Austria.

History

In the 1890s, the founding members of the conservative-clerical Christian Social Party (CS) like Karl von Vogelsang and the Vienna mayor Karl Lueger had already developed anti-liberal views, though primarily from an economic perspective considering the pauperization of the proletariat and the lower middle class. Strongly referring to the doctrine of Catholic social teaching, the CS agitated against the Austrian labour movement led by the Social Democratic Party of Austria.

Self-coup

During the Great Depression in the First Austrian Republic of the early 1930s, the CS on the basis of the Quadragesimo anno encyclical issued by Pope Pius XI in 1931 pursued the idea of overcoming the ongoing class struggle by the implementation of a corporative form of government modelled on Italian fascism and Portugal’s Estado Novo. The CS politician Engelbert Dollfuss, appointed Chancellor of Austria in 1932, on 4 March 1933 saw an opportunity in the resignation of Social Democrat Karl Renner as president of the Austrian Nationalrat, after irregularities occurred during a voting process. Dollfuss called the incident a "self-elimination" (Selbstausschaltung) of the parliament and had the following meeting on 15 March forcibly prorogued by the forces of the Vienna police department. His fellow CS party member, President Wilhelm Miklas, analogous to Adolf Hitler's victory in the German elections of 5 March 1933 did not take any action to restore democracy.

Chancellor Dollfuss then governed by emergency decree, banning the Communist Party on 26 May 1933, the Social Democratic Republikanischer Schutzbund paramilitary organization on 30 May and the Austrian branch of the Nazi Party on 19 June. On 20 May 1933 he had established the Fatherland's Front as a unity party of "an autonomous, Christian, German, corporative Federal State of Austria". On 12 February 1934 the government's attempts to enforce the ban of the Schutzbund at the Hotel Schiff in Linz sparked the Austrian Civil War. The revolt was suppressed with support by the Bundesheer and right-wing Heimwehr troops under Ernst Rüdiger Starhemberg, and ended with the ban of the Social Democratic Party and the trade unions. The path to dictatorship was completed on 1 May 1934, when the Constitution of Austria was recast into a severely authoritarian document by a rump National Council.

Dollfuss continued to rule by emergency measures until his assassination on 25 July 1934 during the Nazi July Putsch. Although the coup d'état initially had the encouragement of Hitler, it was quickly suppressed and Dollfuss's education minister, Kurt Schuschnigg, succeeded him.  Hitler officially denied any involvement in the failed coup, but he continued to destabilise the Austrian state by secretly supporting Nazi sympathisers like Arthur Seyss-Inquart and Edmund Glaise-Horstenau. In turn Austria under Schuschnigg sought the backing of its southern neighbour, the fascist Italian dictator Benito Mussolini. Tables turned after the Second Italo-Abyssinian War of 1935–36, when Mussolini, internationally isolated, approached Hitler. Though Schuschnigg tried to improve relations with Nazi Germany by amnestying several Austrian Nazis and accepting them in the Fatherland's Front, he had no chance to prevail against the "axis" of Berlin and Rome proclaimed by Mussolini on 1 November 1936.

One of the reasons for the failure of the putsch was Italian intervention: Mussolini assembled an army corps of four divisions on the Austrian border and threatened Hitler with a war with Italy in the event of a German invasion of Austria as originally planned, should the coup have been more successful. Support for the Nazi movement in Austria was surpassed only by that in Germany, allegedly amounting to 75% in some areas.

Ideology
The Federal State of Austria glorified the history of Austria. The Habsburg Monarchy was elevated as a time of greatness in Austrian history. The Catholic Church played a large role in the nation's definition of Austrian history and identity, which served to alienate German culture. Unlike Hitler's comparatively secular regime, the Catholic Church was given a prominent voice in a variety of issues. In education, the state de-secularized schools, requiring religious education in order to complete the Matura graduation exams. According to this ideology, Austrians were "better Germans". In keeping with the regime's Catholicism, the regime elevated the non-communist and non-capitalist teachings of Papal Encyclicals, most prominently Quadragesimo anno.

Generally, Dollfuss, completely opposed to Nazi ideology, claimed he wanted to "Out-Hitler" Hitler.

Despite its nominal embrace of corporatism and shunning of liberal capitalism, the Federal State pursued a remarkably capitalistic monetary policy, similar to Nazi Germany and Fascist Italy. Capitalist economist Ludwig von Mises, who had collaborated with Dollfuss before the coup, was made chairman of the Austrian Chamber of Commerce, and with the guidance of Mises and other economists, the Federal State pursued a vigorous policy of austerity in reaction to the Great Depression.

The Federal State pursued harsh deflationary policies to balance the currency. It also cut spending drastically, and high interest rates were the norm. The budget deficit was slashed from over 200 million shillings to less than 50 million. By 1936, only 50% of the unemployed were receiving unemployment benefits. These policies coincided with a catastrophic economic contraction. According to Angus Maddison's estimates, unemployment peaked at 26% in 1933, failing to fall under 20% until 1937. This can be contrasted with German unemployment, which peaked at 30% in 1932 and had fallen to less than 5% by 1937. Additionally, real GDP collapsed, not returning to pre-1929 levels until 1937.

Whether the Federal State could be considered genuinely fascist is debatable. Although it was authoritarian in nature and used fascist-like symbols, it never achieved broad support among Austrians. Its most prominent policy was an embrace of Catholicism, and its economic and social policies bear an only passing resemblance to those of Fascist Italy and Nazi Germany.

Civil rights
John Gunther wrote in 1940 that the state "assaulted the rights of citizens in a fantastic manner", noting that in 1934 the police raided 106,000 homes in Vienna and made 38,141 arrests of Nazis, social democrats, liberals and communists. He added, however:

Anschluss
According to the Hossbach Memorandum, Hitler in November 1937 declared his plans for an Austrian campaign in a meeting with Wehrmacht commanders. Under the mediation of the German ambassador Franz von Papen, Schuschnigg on 12 February 1938 traveled to Hitler's Berghof residence in Berchtesgaden, only to be confronted with an ultimatum to readmit the Nazi Party and to appoint Seyss-Inquart and Glaise-Horstenau ministers of the Austrian cabinet. Schuschnigg, impressed by the presence of OKW chief General Wilhelm Keitel, gave in and on 16 February Seyss-Inquart became head of the strategically important Austrian interior ministry.

After the British ambassador to Berlin, Nevile Henderson on 3 March 1938 had stated that the German claims to Austria were justified, Schuschnigg started a last attempt to retain Austrian autonomy by scheduling a nationwide referendum on 13 March. As part of his effort to ensure victory, he released the Social Democratic leaders from prison and gained their support in return for dismantling the one-party state and legalizing the socialist trade unions. Hitler reacted with the mobilization of Wehrmacht troops at the Austrian border and demanded the appointment of Seyss-Inquart as Austrian chancellor. On 11 March Austrian Nazis stormed the Federal Chancellery and forced Schuschnigg to resign. Seyss-Inquart was sworn in as his successor by Miklas and the next day Wehrmacht troops crossed the border meeting no resistance.

Hitler had originally intended to retain Austria as a puppet state headed by Seyss-Inquart. However, the enthusiastic support for Hitler led him to change his stance and support a full Anschluss between Austria and Nazi Germany. On 13 March Seyss-Inquart formally decreed the Anschluss, though President Miklas avoided signing the law by resigning immediately. Seyss-Inquart then took over most of Miklas' duties and signed the Anschluss bill into law.  Two days later in his speech at the Vienna Heldenplatz, Hitler proclaimed the "accession of my homeland to the German Reich" (see Austria in the time of National Socialism).

References

Further reading

 Stephan Neuhäuser: “Wir werden ganze Arbeit leisten“- Der austrofaschistische Staatsstreich 1934, 
 Emmerich Tálos, Wolfgang Neugebauer: Austrofaschismus. Politik, Ökonomie, Kultur. 1933–1938. 5th Edition, Münster, Austria, 2005, 
 Hans Schafranek: Sommerfest mit Preisschießen. Die unbekannte Geschichte des NS-Putsches im Juli 1934. Czernin Publishers, Vienna 2006.
 Hans Schafranek: Hakenkreuz und rote Fahne. Die verdrängte Kooperation von Nationalsozialisten und Linken im illegalen Kampf gegen die Diktatur des 'Austrofaschismus'''. In: Bochumer Archiv für die Geschichte des Widerstandes und der Arbeit, No.9 (1988), pp. 7 – 45.
 Jill Lewis: Austria: Heimwehr, NSDAP and the Christian Social State (in Kalis, Aristotle A.: The Fascism Reader. London/New York)
 Lucian O. Meysels: Der Austrofaschismus – Das Ende der ersten Republik und ihr letzter Kanzler. Amalthea, Vienna and Munich, 1992
 Erika Weinzierl: Der Februar 1934 und die Folgen für Österreich. Picus Publishers, Vienna 1994
 Manfred Scheuch: Der Weg zum Heldenplatz. Eine Geschichte der österreichischen Diktatur 1933–1938. Publishing House Kremayr & Scheriau, Vienna 2005, 
 Andreas Novak: Salzburg hört Hitler atmen: Die Salzburger Festspiele 1933–1944. DVA, Stuttgart 2005, .
 David Schnaiter: Zwischen Russischer Revolution und Erster Republik. Die Tiroler Arbeiterbewegung gegen Ende des "Großen Krieges".'' Grin Verlag, Ravensburg (2007). , 

Austrofascism
1934 establishments in Austria
1938 disestablishments in Austria
States and territories established in 1934
States and territories disestablished in 1938
Austria
Former republics
Former countries of the interwar period
Former countries